Royal Easter Show may refer to:
 Sydney Royal Easter Show
 Auckland Royal Easter Show